Nikolai Ivanovich Utkin (Russian: Николай Иванович Уткин; 19 May 1780, in Tver – 17 March 1863, in Saint Petersburg) was a Russian graphic artist, engraver and illustrator. He also served as curator of prints at the Hermitage and superintendent of the museum at the Imperial Academy of Arts.

Biography 

His mother was a serf on the estate of the poet Mikhail Nikitich Muravyov, who is generally assumed to have been his father. She was later given in marriage to Muravyov's chamberlain, Ivan Utkin. Shortly after Nikolai's birth, they moved to Saint Petersburg. In 1785, he was manumitted and began his education at the Imperial Academy which, at that time, had a primary school.

At the age of fourteen, having shown a talent for drawing, he was transferred to the engraving school, where he studied with Antoine Radigues and the German engraver, Ignaz Sebastian Klauber. Four years later, he created eighteen engravings of antique statues, which earned him a gold medal and the right to continue at the Academy for three more years. However, in 1802, he was awarded another gold medal that also conferred the right to travel abroad and he took advantage of that right as soon as possible; leaving for Paris in 1803.

Once there, he was engaged at the workshop of Charles Clément Balvay (known as "Bervic"), where he helped fulfill orders as well as study. In 1810, he exhibited at the Salon, receiving a gold medal from the Académie des Beaux-Arts and the title of "Academician" from the Imperial Academy. During the French invasion of Russia, he was under house arrest and police surveillance for two years, until Napoleon's defeat.

He returned to Saint Petersburg upon his release and, after Klauber's death, took his positions at the Academy and the Hermitage. In 1819, he was appointed official engraver to the Tsar, at a salary of 3,000 rubles per year. In addition to his regular engravings, he provided illustrations for works by Vasily Zhukovsky and Gavrila Derzhavin, as well as a translation of the Iliad by Nikolai Gnedich.

He became a Professor in 1831 and was named Professor Emeritus in 1840 but, at that point, he was already past the height of his creative powers. In 1850, he handed over his engraving class to Iordan. In 1860, the Academy honored him with an embossed gold medallion. His last known work, a depiction of the Holy Family, was completed just before his death in 1863.

Selected works

References

Further reading 
 Dmitry Rovinsky, Николай Иванович Уткин, его жизнь и произведения. (Life and Works), Imperial Academy of Sciences, 1884 Complete text online @ Google Books
 Galina Printseva, Николай Иванович Уткин. 1780—1863, Искусство, 1983

External links 

1780 births
1863 deaths
Russian engravers
Russian graphic designers
People from Tver
Curators from Saint Petersburg
Burials at Tikhvin Cemetery